The 2019 Indian general election was held in Haryana on 12 May 2019 to constitute the 17th Lok Sabha.

Result

Party wise

Constituency wise

Candidates

Assembly segments wise lead of Parties

References 

2019 Indian general election
2019 Indian general election by state or union territory
Indian general elections in Haryana
2010s in Haryana